Bobbi Law (born 4 June 1997) is an Australian rugby league footballer who plays for the Newcastle Knights in the NRL Women's Premiership. She previously played for the Sydney Roosters in the NRL Women's Premiership and the Central Coast Roosters in the NSWRL Women's Premiership.

Background
Law was born in Newcastle, New South Wales and played her junior rugby league for the Central Coast Roosters.

Playing career
In 2019, Law played for CRL Newcastle in the NSWRL Women's Premiership, scoring a try in their 24–10 Grand Final win over Mounties RLFC. In May 2019, she represented NSW Country at the Women's National Championships.

In July 2019, she joined the Sydney Roosters NRL Women's Premiership team. In Round 3 of the 2019 NRL Women's season, she made her debut for the Roosters, scoring a try in their 16–24 loss to the St George Illawarra Dragons.

On 22 February 2020, she represented the Indigenous All Stars in their 10–4 over the Maori All Stars.

On 25 November 2021, Law signed with the Newcastle Knights to be a part of their inaugural NRLW squad.

In round 1 of the delayed 2021 NRL Women's season, Law made her club debut for the Knights against the Parramatta Eels.

On 2 October 2022, Law played in the Knights' 32-12 NRLW Grand Final win over the Parramatta Eels.

References

External links
Newcastle Knights profile
Sydney Roosters profile

1997 births
Living people
Indigenous Australian rugby league players
Australian female rugby league players
Rugby league centres
Sydney Roosters (NRLW) players
Newcastle Knights (NRLW) players